Blasphemy is the act of insulting or showing contempt or lack of reverence for God or towards religious or holy persons or things, or toward something considered sacred or inviolable.

Blasphemy may also refer to:

Books
Blasphemy, a novel by Tehmina Durrani 
 Blasphemy (Preston novel), a 2008 techno-thriller novel
Blasphemy (story collection), a 2012 story collection by Sherman Alexie
 Blasphemy: A Memoir, real story of Asia Bibi sentenced to death for blasphemy

Music
 Blasphemy (band), a black metal band
 Blasphemy (Incantation album), 2002
 Blasphemy (Kayo Dot album), 2019
 “Blasphemy”, a song by Tupac Shakur from the album The Don Killuminati: The 7 Day Theory
 “Blasphemy”, a song by Bring Me the Horizon from the album That's the Spirit
 “Blasphemy”, a song from Tyler Joseph’s solo album No Phun Intended
 “Blasphemy”, a song by Robbie Williams and Guy Chambers from Williams' album Reality Killed the Video Star

See also 
 Blasphemer (disambiguation)